Callimicra festiva is a species of metallic wood-boring beetle in the family Buprestidae.

References 

Buprestidae
Beetles described in 1925